The 2017/18 FIS Cup (ski jumping) was the 13th FIS Cup season in ski jumping for men and the 6th for ladies.

Other competitive circuits this season included the World Cup, Grand Prix, Continental Cup, FIS Race and Alpen Cup.

Calendar

Men

Ladies

Overall standings

Men

Ladies

References 

2017 in ski jumping
2018 in ski jumping
FIS Cup (ski jumping)